Tufts Medical Center station is an underground Massachusetts Bay Transportation Authority (MBTA) rapid transit station in Boston, Massachusetts. It serves the MBTA subway Orange Line, as well as two Silver Line bus rapid transit routes on the surface. It is named for the Tufts Medical Center and is built under a wing of the facility that crosses over Washington Street in downtown Boston between Kneeland Street in Chinatown and the Massachusetts Turnpike. The accessible station has two side platforms for the Orange Line, while Silver Line buses stop along the sidewalks on the surface next to the station entrance on Washington Street. A secondary entrance is available on Tremont Street one block to the west.

Construction of the South Cove Tunnel and the station shell took place in 1968–1971 in preparation for a rerouting of the Orange Line into the Interstate 95 median. The highway project was cancelled; the right of way was reused as the Southwest Corridor. It opened in 1987, along with the New England Medical Center station. Silver Line service began in 2002. The station was renamed Tufts Medical Center in 2010.

Station layout

The station was constructed under a city block that had been previously cleared for the South Cove urban renewal effort. This gives it several important differences from Chinatown, Downtown Crossing, and State along Washington Street to the north, which were all threaded among existing underground structures. Because it was easier to dig deeply on the empty plot, Tufts Medical Center station has a subsurface fare mezzanine, rather than having faregates located immediately adjacent to the platforms. The platform areas are much wider and taller than the older stations, and the inbound and outbound platforms are directly opposite each other, rather than offset.

The station was not constructed directly under Washington Street; it is angled towards Tremont Street to the west, as the line then curves towards Back Bay. Unlike the older stations, there is a single headhouse on the west side of Washington Street rather than smaller entrances on both sides of the street. This entrance is located under an overhang of a Tufts Medical Center building. There is a secondary entrance without elevator access, located on Tremont Street at Oak Street. Adding elevators to the South Cove entrance was considered by the MBTA in 2017.

Artwork
Artwork was added to the station as part of the Arts on the Line program. Four abstract works, titled Caravan, are displayed beside each of the two escalators to the train platforms, They consist of painted aluminum shapes designed by Richard Gubernick, who also has artwork displayed in LaSalle station in Buffalo, New York. At each station between Forest Hills and Tufts Medical Center, two granite columns near the outside entrance have been inscribed with text. Those at Tufts are "Mr. Yee is in the Garden" by Maria Gordett and "The Great World Transformed" by Gish Jen.

Bus connections
The SL4 section serves South Station, while the SL5 section serves Downtown Crossing and Boylston. Silver Line buses stop at the primary station entrance on Washington Street.

The station also sees conventional bus service from three MBTA bus routes. Routes  and  run on Washington Street and stop at the same location as the Silver Line, while route  runs on Tremont Street and is accessed through the station's secondary headhouse.

History

In 1914, the Boston Transit Commission considered constructing a station at Bennet Street where the Washington Street Tunnel rose to the surface to meet the Washington Street Elevated. The proposal was rejected due to the steep grade and the proximity to Boylston station.

In September 1968, the MBTA began construction of the shell of a station - then called South Cove - and the South Cove Tunnel during what were to be the early stages of the abandoned Interstate 695 project, in anticipation of the future relocation of the Washington Street Elevated. The relocated Orange Line was to run in the median of the extended I-95 in the Southwest Corridor, then replace service on the Needham Line to Needham. Due to a lack of available federal funds, the MBTA financed the $13.3 million project with local bond funds. The tunnel (which reached to Marginal Street) and the station shell were completed in 1972. However, I-695 was cancelled due to local opposition in 1971; the Elevated remained in service, and the South Cove Tunnel and station sat unused.

After the plans for I-95 to be extended into downtown fell through in 1973, the state began looking to use the Southwest Corridor for a combined Orange Line and commuter rail corridor. In 1975, the MBTA applied for $29 million in federal grants to extend the South Cove Tunnel to just past Arlington Street and to finish the interior of South Cove station. Construction began in earnest on the Southwest Corridor in 1979. In 1985, as part of a series of station name changes, the MBTA board voted to name the station New England Medical Center, with South Cove retained as a secondary name. The station opened on May 4, 1987, along with eight other stations from Back Bay to Forest Hills. 

Silver Line service on Washington Street between Nubian and Downtown Crossing started on July 20, 2002, replacing the former route 49 bus. Additional service to South Station (now signed SL4) began on October 15, 2009. The station was renamed to Tufts Medical Center on March 19, 2010 after the New England Medical Center similarly changed its name. The entire Orange Line, including Tufts Medical Center station, was closed from August 19 to September 18, 2022, during maintenance work.

References

External links

MBTA - Tufts Medical Center
Google Maps Street View: Washington Street headhouse, Tremont Street headhouse

Orange Line (MBTA) stations
Railway stations located underground in Boston
Railway stations in the United States opened in 1987
Silver Line (MBTA) stations